James Eugene Wilkes (October 1, 1925 – August 11, 2008), nicknamed "Seabiscuit", was a professional baseball outfielder. He played in Negro league baseball for the Newark Eagles from 1945 to 1948. He was a member of the 1946 Negro World Series championship team, and was an All-Star in 1948.

In 1949 and 1950, Wilkes played for the Houston Eagles of the Negro American League. He then played in Minor League Baseball from 1950 through 1952 in the Brooklyn Dodgers organization. After only appearing in nine minor-league games in 1952, he returned to the Negro American League with the Indianapolis Clowns that season.

Wilkes subsequently played with the Brantford Red Sox of Southern Ontario from 1953 through 1963. In five of those seasons, the Red Sox were champions of the Intercounty Baseball League. He is considered one of the top 100 players in league history. After retiring as a player, Wilkes served as an umpire in the league for 23 years.

References

Further reading

External links
, or Seamheads
Jimmy Wilkes at Negro Leagues Baseball Museum

1925 births
2008 deaths
Baseball outfielders
Newark Eagles players
Houston Eagles players
Indianapolis Clowns players
Elmira Pioneers players
Trois-Rivières Royals players
Lancaster Red Roses players
Great Falls Electrics players
Baseball players from Philadelphia
American expatriate baseball players in Canada
Brantford Red Sox players
John Bartram High School alumni
Baseball umpires
20th-century African-American sportspeople
21st-century African-American people